Distribution Media Format (DMF) is a format for floppy disks that Microsoft used to distribute software. It allowed the disk to contain 1680 KB of data on a 3-inch disk, instead of the standard 1440 KB. As a side effect, utilities had to specially support the format in order to read and write the disks, which made copying of products distributed on this medium more difficult. An Apple Macintosh computer running Disk Copy 6.3.3 on the Mac OS 7.6 or later operating system can copy and make DMF disks. The first Microsoft software product that uses DMF for distribution were the "c" revisions of Office 4.x. It also was the first software product to use CAB files, then called "Diamond".

Comparison of DMF and standard 1440 KB 3-inch diskettes:

DMF in the form of a 1680 KB Virtual Floppy Disk (VFD) image and IBM Extended Density Format (XDF) images are supported by Windows Virtual PC.

See also 

 2M, a program that allows the formatting of high-capacity floppy disks
 fdformat, a DOS program that allows the formatting of high-capacity floppy disks
 HDCopy, a DOS program that can read and write floppy disk and disk images in multiple formats, including DMF
 IBM Extended Density Format (XDF), a high-density diskette format used by IBM

References

External links 
 About DMF

Floppy disk computer storage
Microsoft